Demarteau is a surname. Notable people with the surname include:

 Gilles Demarteau (1722–1776), Belgian-French etcher, engraver, and art publisher
 Wilhelmus Demarteau (1917–2012), Dutch and Indonesian prelate of the Roman Catholic Church